Paracorymbia maculicornis is a species of longhorn beetle in Lepturinae subfamily. It was described by Charles De Geer in 1775 and is found in central and northern Europe. Their flight time is from May to August, with a life cycle of 2 years. They eat polyphagous, coniferous and deciduous trees, the species of which are birches, firs, spruce, and pines.

References

Lepturinae
Beetles described in 1775
Taxa named by Charles De Geer
Beetles of Europe